Gary Colin May (born 7 May 1967) is an English former footballer who played twice as a midfielder in the Football League for Darlington before a broken leg forced his retirement. He worked as a holiday rep and as a flight attendant on a major commercial airline, and published a book about his experiences in the latter role. He went on to keep a pub.

References

1967 births
Living people
Footballers from Darlington
English footballers
Association football midfielders
Darlington F.C. players
English Football League players
Flight attendants